Danila Vladimirovich Kashin (born November 6, 1996), also known as DK, is a Russian video blogger, rap artist and EDM producer. On his YouTube channels he publishes videos of musical parodies and author's video clips

History 
Dania was born on 6 November 1996 in Kazan. His father left him at an early age. He did not have any brothers or sisters, so he was raised by his mother. His childhood was difficult as he fought a lot with his mother. There was almost nothing in his yard, so he had fun the best he could with the little he had. He almost burned to death, but it turned out to just be minor burns. As a child, his mother sent Danila to a music school to learn the piano. He did not finish school, and at the age of 11 he learned about the FL Studio program, with which he began to create his first tracks. As a teenager, Kashin tried to turn his hobby into an art.

Career and creativity 
In 2013, he created his YouTube channel "DK Inc.", the first video was uploaded in 2016. The first videos were lets-plays on the video game: Counter-Strike: Global Offensive, but later videos were about music, as well as other lifestyle videos.

In 2015 he took part in the reality show "Likes Factory".

On May 19, 2017, Kashin's first solo concert took place in Moscow.

One June 18, 2017, the video "diss on ateva" which was directed by Kashin, was released. The video brought Kashin success.

In July 2017, Danil announced his debut tour of Russia and Belarus with another vlogger from St. Petersburg.

On 7 September 2017, together with the online store "Mom, Buy!", a range of accessories like backpacks, hoodies, T-shirts, sweatshirts, caps and others.

On January 30, 2018, Kashin launched a series of parody short films titled "Swindlers in the Sites", which is a parody of the Ukrainian reality show "Swindlers in the Networks". The guest included Yulik, Yuri Khovansky, Kuzma, Sovergon, CMH, blogger Motor, Sveta Deidrimer, Ilya Kulich, Vladimir Elgin and Ruslan Gabidullin.

On June 4, 2018, together with CMH (Ruslan Tushentsov), he announced a tour of Russian cities called Splatterhouse.

In September 2018, he performed on the stages of the Wildfest blogger festival in St. Petersburg and Moscow

In September 2018, the rap battle of Purnoy and Kashin was announced. It took place at the RapYou Battle site of the VSRAP project.

In June 2019, the album "Nenahod" was released. There are 8 tracks in total

On February 8, 2020, Kashin stopped cooperation with the online store "Mom, Buy!"

On August 21, 2020, the album "Synonim" was released. It contained 10 songs including an intro.

On November 22, 2020, Danila created his own clothing brand "Damn! Wear", where he sells his merch.

On February 17, 2021, Danila received a gold disc from Sony Music Russia for the album "Synonim".

On September 17, 2021, Danila released the single "Ping Pong" - a joint song with GSPD, as well as a music video.

On October 1, 2021, Danila released the album "HYPOCRITE EP". The album included old tracks with a mix of new ones.

Complaint against Pavel Durov 
On March 18, 2017, Danil Kashin stated that one of the founders and former CEO of the social network VKontakte , now the CEO of the Telegram messenger, Pavel Durov, broke his phone. According to the blogger, Kashin and his friends met Durov in the shopping center of St. Petersburg "Gallery” and asked to take a photo with him. Pavel, in turn, according to Danil, did not mind, but later grabbed his phone and threw the smartphone from the fourth floor of the shopping center and immediately left. After the incident, Kashin recorded an emotional video, which in a couple of days gained more than half a million views and raised a huge public outcry . After some time, the video was no longer available on YouTube .

Durov himself did not comment publicly on the situation, only announced on his VKontakte page that he did not read comments there, and asked to write them on his Instagram profile. A photo from Zermatt was published there on March 18 . After some time, Izvestia journalist Vladimir Zykov asked him to comment on the situation. Durov replied that "the most organic way would be to do this through a personal YouTube channel "  . After a while, he shared a link to the channel on his VKontakte page., where at that time there was one video I liked called "Narcos: coma mierda" ( Russian Narco: eat shit ). In the comments, users suggested that in this way Durov left a message to everyone who believes in the story of his broken smartphone.

Discography

Studio albums

Singles

As lead performer

As guest performer

Music videos

Author's videos

Parodies

A cappella

Participation in rap battles

RapYou battle

References 

1996 births
Living people
Russian bloggers
Russian rappers
Russian comedy musicians
Russian parodists
Russian YouTubers
Music YouTubers
Russian video bloggers
Parody musicians